The 1994 Algerian Super Cup is the  3rd edition of Algerian Super Cup, a football match contested by the winners of the Championnat National and 1993–94 Algerian Cup competitions. The match was scheduled to be played on 8 September 1994 at Stade 5 Juillet 1962 in Algiers between 1993–94 Championnat National winners US Chaouia and 1993–94 Algerian Cup winners JS Kabylie.

Match details

References 

1994
Supercup
JS Kabylie matches